Giorgio Campanella (born 20 February 1970) is an Italian former professional boxer who competed from 1990 to 2000, challenging three times for a world title between 1994 and 1998. As an amateur, he competed in the men's lightweight event at the 1988 Summer Olympics.

References

External links
 
 
 

1970 births
Living people
Italian male boxers
Olympic boxers of Italy
Boxers at the 1988 Summer Olympics
People from Crotone
Lightweight boxers
Sportspeople from the Province of Crotone
20th-century Italian people